The Volvo FH is a heavy truck range manufactured by the Swedish company Volvo Trucks. It was originally introduced in late 1993 as the FH12 and FH16. FH stands for Forward control High entry, where numbers denominate engine capacity in litres. The FH range is one of the most successful truck series ever having sold more than 400,000 units worldwide.

In September 2012, Volvo Trucks re-launched the Volvo FH with significant technology upgrades.

History

In late 1993 Volvo unveiled its replacement for the F cabover series in production for almost 15 years. The development of FH in what it appeared to be a clean sheet of paper design took seven long years. The development of the all-new design 12-litre engine with its overhead camshaft and electronic unit injectors technology placed Volvo among the world's leading engine designers.

First generation (1993–2002)

There were two models, FH12 and FH16 which shared common cabs and chassis. The FH12 won "Truck of the year" award in 1994. The 16-litre engine, gearboxes, and the driveline were carried over from the previous generation, albeit with improvements and additional features including all-new Volvo engine management and its diagnostics for the D12A engine.

Design and technology

Cab
The cab produced at Umeå from hot-dip galvanized, high tensile steel allowed for greater strength at thinner panels and box sections while reducing overall weight. The new FH cab was more aerodynamically efficient, with improved ergonomics and seating while reducing the overall weight of the cab by almost 30%. The cabin was extensively tested in a wind tunnel to confirm shape aerodynamics properties to reduce air-drag thus improving fuel efficiency. The cab featured a more sharply raked windscreen while wedge-shaped sides rounded into the front panel at much wider radius corners and the rear vision mirrors were also streamlined. The cabin was subject to the toughest cab impact test where procedure involved placing a 15-tonne static weight on the roof and one-tonne pendulum striking at the cab rear wall and at the windscreen pillars, at the end of which the cab doors must be able to be opened. In 1995 Volvo FH series became first heavy-duty truck to be fitted with an SRS airbag to further improve passive safety.

D12 engine 
From the design angle, the new D12A engine was one of the largest engine projects from Volvo Trucks since the 1950s at the time. The basic design was still based on direct injection in-line six diesel engines around 12 litres displacement but with entirely different fuel and valve systems when compared with previous Volvo engines. Built at the purpose-built facility at Skövde on a fully automated line where the bulk of the engine assembly is done by robots and the final engine dressing is carried out manually. The D12A was designed as a "world engine" to be able to meet the latest demands in high power output, low fuel consumption and lower emissions with its single OHC (overhead camshaft) design, four valves per cylinder, and one centrally located electronic unit injector, integrated engine compression brake and two-piece, steel and aluminium pistons. The engine design left the door open for future upgrades in both power output and emission technologies.

VEB
VEB  The Volvo Engine Brake is a compression type engine brake first introduced on D12A and since used on later designed OHC engines from 9 to 16 litre displacement. The brake operates on a principle where exhaust valve cam followers act on a secondary cam profile when engine brake is activated. Engine oil pressure is used to eliminate extra valve clearance thus this action forces the follower against secondary lobes and unseating exhaust valves temporarily to achieve so-called compression bleeding as employed by similar systems from Jacobs, Cummins and Mack however Volvo system has an extra cam lobe thus giving two openings of the exhaust valves and is designed to work in conjunction with an exhaust brake so two of the engine's four strokes are used to raise engine braking effect - Exhaust and Compression strokes. 
Operation Description
 The exhaust stroke is used when exhaust brake shutter closes exhaust manifold after turbocharger opening as a result exhaust back pressure is raised creating the braking effect.
The compression stroke is used next to utilise the backpressure in exhaust where at the piston's Bottom Dead Centre the exhaust valve is opened briefly and high pressure in the exhaust manifold is then let in acting against the piston moving upwards on its compression stroke thus slowing it even more [further explanation needed, exhaust braking functions in relation to cylinder pressure, not piston speed] and increasing the engine braking effect.
 At the end of the compression stroke just before piston's Top Dead Centre exhaust valves are open briefly again to release "bleed" compression thus again slowing the piston on its subsequent downwards movement and consequently achieving engine braking effect while also storing the pressure in the exhaust manifold again using the exhaust brake shutter ready for the next repeat of the cycle.

Version 98 (1998–2002)

In conjunction with the introduction of FM series in 1998, Volvo had facelifted existing FH series with minor modifications to the cab but major upgrade to the electrical system, engine, and gearbox. The so-called TEA (Truck Electronic Architecture) introduced a technical solution to possibility of various electronic control units to work and communicate with one another. The systems have been linked using two data buses or data links which allowed control units to exchange relevant information over the data network.

Electronics
TEA is a computerized control and monitoring system which is used to control and coordinate the various functions of the vehicle main components. The control units communicate over what is known as CAN at two speeds SAEJ1587/1708 @9600  bit/s and SAEJ1939 @ 250 000 bit/s where up to eight Electronic Control Units were used to control various functions. A J1939 data link is used for mission-critical rapid communication among ECUs and  J1587/1808  is used for diagnostic and programming links as well as "slow" communication e.g. for backup purposes. The new instrument cluster included an LCD panel to show information or diagnostic messages from the systems broadcast via the J1708 data link.

D12 facelift
The original D12A engine was considered as a rather conservatively power rated and expectations of higher power output from such an engine design were always at the mind of not only the designer but customers alike.

Gearbox
The gearboxes were based on the previous SR1900 series and shared the same number of gears and gear change pattern. The SR2400 series gearbox was discontinued and replaced with the now same model shared across the entire FH and FM range. Torque increases from 1900 Nm to 2500 Nm were due to changes to the machining of the gears as well as the use of the new type of narrower synchromesh mechanism allowing increased gear width. The single control housing and the synchro-mechanism reduced the gearchange effort by about 50%. The control housing was also identical for left and right-hand drive versions reducing overall production cost and assembly.

Second generation (2002–2012)

In 2001 Volvo introduced the second generation of the FH and FM series with the cab and driveline given a major makeover. with an investment cost of 600 million euros  Major changes included a redesign of the cab to improve aerodynamics, the new automatic gearchange transmission, I shift, new electronics system and engine improvements.

Cab
The changes to the cab included a new day cab, which is 150 mm longer with a redesigned air intake and flat floor. New rearview mirrors were introduced to reduce blind spots and improve airflow, new headlights, and front side marker lights, a new split sun visor, and new wider front steps complemented the external modifications. The interior was redesigned with more rounded edges around the dashboard and new seats with integrated seatbelts. Integrated telephone speaker and microphone with steering wheel controls for the radio and inbuilt GSM phones were an option.

As a standard equipment FH models also included FUPS  (Front Underrun Protection System) to further enhance safety by preventing smaller vehicles from being "underrun" or wedged under front of the truck in an event of frontal collision.

TC and I-Shift 
D12D's further development of venerable D12C resulted in increased power output to  equipped with turbo compound (TC) technology which utilise more energy from exhaust gases after the turbocharger using an extra turbine to drive the engine crankshaft via hydraulic clutch and reduction gearing.  The cooling system changes coincided with more advanced electronics for engine management systems= (EMS)  with an electronically controlled cooling fan which was now fully controlled by the Engine ECU (EECU) and as a result fuel consumption is also reduced.

   
I-Shift transmissions  is a concept of manual transmission with computerized gear change control Transmission Management System
(TMS) which contains two ECU's the transmission control unit (TECU) and the gear selector control unit (GECU). I-Shift borrowed from old transmission technologies like non-synchronised main gears which allowed a reduction in size and weight and a countershaft brake to achieve more precise shift control while matching engine rpm to transmissions rpm e.g. TECU requests the EECU to correct engine rpm so as to synchronise the rpm to effect a smooth gear change, similar to double-clutching.

2003 FH16 Intelligent Power 

After delaying introduction of new 16 litre engine for 2 years  in 2003 Volvo introduced one of the most powerful trucks ever built. The notable design changes included timing gears being on the flywheel side of the engine (rear-mounted), a design which allows for increased airflow around the engine, more precise injection and valve operation, noise reduction, and manufacturing cost due to flywheel casing being used to house timing gears as well. In 2005 Volvo had increased the available power of D16C to   respectively making in it one of the most powerful production truck available. Currently D16E engines are available in Selective Catalytic Reduction at power output  580 hp 640 hp .

2005–2008 FH 

Initially available to meet Euro III emissions requirements, further improvements will enable the engine to meet or exceed Euro IV and possibly Euro V emissions  targets. D13A featured closed-crankcase ventilation and also included a new type of unit injector (UI) E3 from Delphi. As a part of makeover Volvo has also removed its naming scheme and decided to drop engine size in the model name so the models are known from now as FH only. Volvo had also introduced on D13A engine with Selective Catalytic Reduction an improved version of its engine compression brake the "VEB+" featuring additional helper rocker arm and a fourth cam lobe per cylinder.

In 2007 Volvo introduced D13B  with Exhaust Gas Recirculation configuration and VGT turbocharger but without exhaust particle filter and is the only manufacturer to offer this solution thus far.

2008–2012 FH and FH16 Mk.III

In August 2008, Volvo launched an upgrade to the FH series  with the main emphasis on driver comfort and usability, among features listed are windscreen wipers controlled by a rain sensor, cornering lights for better visibility when turning, powerful audio system with USB aux and MP3 inputs as well as a swiveling passenger seat. 
Completely redesigned grill, steps, sun visor, and headlamps combination were the most obvious visible changes over previous models. Continuing on its Euro V theme upgrades to 13 Litre engines and introduction of the new 11 Litre engine followed a few months later.

As a part of an ongoing commitment to road safety, a number of safety features were also improved like advanced radar-controlled cruise control, Driver Alert System (DAS) which keeps a tab on the driver's time behind the wheel with ongoing monitoring of the driver's responses, Lane Keeping Support (LKS) which alerts the driver when crossing over the lines and Lane Change Support (LCS) system responsible for alerting the driver when another vehicle is in the "blind spot" when attempting to change lanes.

In 2011 the new 750 hp version of the D16 was presented to the market. This engine will be delivered to customers around the new year 2012, celebrating 25 years of Volvo 16-litre truck engines.

Third generation (2012–present) 

In September 2012, Volvo Trucks re-launched the Volvo FH with major technology upgrades, a new design, and more. The company also introduced the first of its Euro VI engines, the D13K which is available as an option on the new Volvo FH and compulsory for new trucks in Europe from January 2014. Other quotable new features are the I-torque driveline and the I-see fuel-saving technology. With the new thirteen-litre engine, the name has changed to FH13.

AEB
Volvo Trucks have demonstrated the new AEB system for their FH series on YouTube. The truck did well and stopped only centimeters from the car ahead. The tractor-trailer was fully loaded to 40 tons GCW when Volvo demonstrated the system.

The AEB system combines radar and a camera that works together to identify and monitor vehicles in front. The system is designed to deal with both stationary and moving vehicles and can prevent a collision with a moving target at relative speeds of up to 70 km/h. When the system detects a vehicle that the truck will hit at its current speed, the warning system activates a constant red light in the windscreen in order to bring the driver's attention back to the road.

2020 facelift
The truck received a facelift in 2020, with most notably a new headlight design, an updated interior, new safety features, and efficiency improvements.

Pre-facelift model continues to be offered in selected markets where facelifted model was introduced, now marketed as Volvo FH Classic for models with 13-litre engines and Volvo FH16 Classic for models with 16-litre engines.

Gallery

References 

Cab over vehicles
FH
Vehicles introduced in 1993